OntoCAPE is a large-scale ontology for the domain of Computer-Aided Process Engineering (CAPE). It can be downloaded free of charge via the OntoCAPE Homepage.

OntoCAPE is partitioned into 62 sub-ontologies, which can be used individually or as an integrated suite. The sub-ontologies are organized across different abstraction layers, which separate general knowledge from knowledge about particular domains and applications.

 The upper layers have the character of an upper ontology, covering general topics such  as mereotopology, systems theory, quantities and units.
 The lower layers conceptualize the domain of chemical process engineering, covering domain-specific topics such as materials, chemical reactions, or unit operations.

Further reading 
 Marquardt et al. (2010). OntoCAPE: A Re-Usable Ontology for Chemical Process Engineering. Springer-Verlag, Berlin Heidelberg.

External links 
 OntoCAPE Homepage

Knowledge representation
Ontology (information science)